Nils Gelbjerg-Hansen (born 7 October 1968) is a Danish alpine skier. He competed in two events at the 1992 Winter Olympics.

References

External links
 

1968 births
Living people
Danish male alpine skiers
Olympic alpine skiers of Denmark
Alpine skiers at the 1992 Winter Olympics
Sportspeople from Copenhagen